Kalo Chorio or Çamlıköy was the western terminus of the Cyprus Government Railway. It was built in an uninhabited area on the southeastern outskirts of Çamlıköy in 1905.

References

Lefke District
Railway stations in Asia
Passenger rail transport in Cyprus
Railway stations opened in 1905
1905 establishments in the British Empire